Wilson House, also known as Old Jail and Yorkville Jail, is a historic home located at York, York County, South Carolina. It is attributed to Robert Mills and was built in 1828.  It is a three-story, brick building originally designed as a local jail. It features brick arches and a semi-circular fanlight. It was converted into a residence in 1853, then used as a jail during the Reconstruction Era when Federal troops imprisoned Ku Klux Klan members.

It was added to the National Register of Historic Places in 1974.

References

Robert Mills buildings
Government buildings on the National Register of Historic Places in South Carolina
Houses on the National Register of Historic Places in South Carolina
Government buildings completed in 1828
Houses in York County, South Carolina
National Register of Historic Places in York County, South Carolina